The Challenging the Frontiers of Poverty Reduction: Targeting the Ultra Poor (CFPR-TUP) project was initiated by BRAC, a Bangladesh-based development organisation in 2002. The ultra poor are a group of people who eat below 80% of their energy requirements despite spending at least 80% of income on food. In Bangladesh, they constitute the poorest 17.5 percent of the population. These people suffer from chronic hunger and malnutrition, have inadequate shelter, are more prone to disease, deprived of education and more vulnerable to recurring natural disasters. The CFPR-TUP programme is aimed at households which are too poor to access the benefits from development interventions such as microfinance and assists them to access mainstream development services. The program costs around US$35 million a year.

Graduation process
The graduation approach is a two-year program aimed at lifting the ultra poor into a better economic and social condition. It starts with the allocation of an asset such as cattle or poultry, as well as training on how to raise them. It also includes food or cash support alongside, partly to reduce the need to eat or sell the asset in a financial crisis. There is a savings account, health education and regular coaching to reinforce skills and build confidence. The indicators are positive changes in food security, diversified income sources, asset ownership, improved housing, school enrolment and social acceptance. After completion of the two-year grant phase, the ultra poor members participate in BRAC's mainstream development programmes.

A study released in 2010 reported that more than 95% of participants left the category of ultra-poverty over the 24 months, and stayed out of it four years later. A randomised control trial released in 2013 showed sustained shifts in value of livestock, self-employment, earnings and self-reported happiness – long after the period of support had ended.

Since its inception the program has covered 1.6 million ultra poor households in 44 districts of Bangladesh. Outside Bangladesh, Consultative Group for Assisting Poor (CGAP), a World Bank organisation, and the Ford Foundation have studied the TUP program, adapted in eight countries in Latin America, Africa, the Middle East and elsewhere in Asia, explicitly modelled on BRAC's. After 1.5 to 3 years, 75% to 98% of participants meet "graduation" criteria. Nicholas Kristof mentioned in a New York Times column that this model is the mechanism of hope that helps people make headway out of poverty. BRAC is ready to open-source their approach, both to help other countries achieve similar results and also to refine their own methodology.

Participatory wealth ranking 
The first step is targeting or finding the people who needs help the most. This is done through what BRAC calls "participatory wealth ranking" – gathering about 40 to 50 people in the village or community to determine the poorest. Program staff follow up with in-person visits to potential participants, using a set of standard criteria – number of meals a day, whether their roof is thatched or tin, and so on – to determine who qualifies. Senior managers then verify the selection. It is a mix of bottom-up participatory involvement and top-down supervision, intended to ensure that no ultra-poor are left out, and funds are not wasted on those who could benefit from a less costly intervention.

Asset grants, training and follow-ups 
The next step is transfer of assets such as a goat, chickens or a cow, a cash and food stipend to give the beneficiary breathing room while learning a new trade or access a savings account. Training in basic literacy and numeracy like writing their names and basic preventative and curative healthcare takes place alongside. Others in the community, including village elites, are brought into the process. Coaching or "hand-holding", in the form of weekly visits from program staff to overcome challenges, is essential in the approach.

Graduation 
Continuing to save after the end of the program can help beneficiaries/participants protect assets and accumulate money for future investments or emergencies. A shared goal across the pilots was that by the end of the program, members had access to a wide range of financial services. The Graduation Approach is not a short-term escape from extreme poverty but instead seeks to equip participants with the tools, livelihoods, and self-confidence to sustain themselves when the program is over.

See also

 NGOs in Bangladesh
 Grameen Bank
 TMSS (NGO)
 ASA (NGO)
 BRAC University
 Aarong
 Solidarity lending

References

Economic development programs
Development innovation in Bangladesh
Poverty activism
Rural community development
BRAC (organisation)